Warren Anthony Powers (February 19, 1941 – November 2, 2021) was an American football player and coach. He was the head coach at Washington State University in 1977, and the University of Missouri from 1978 through 1984, compiling an overall college football record of

Early years
He was an all-state high school quarterback at Bishop Lillis High School from Kansas City, Missouri, and played college football at Nebraska, earning three letters as a Husker. As a senior, he helped lead Bob Devaney's first Nebraska team in 1962. 

Powers played professionally for six years in the American Football League (AFL) with the Oakland Raiders. As a safety, he started for the 1967 AFL Champion Raiders and in the second AFL-NFL World Championship game, known now as Super Bowl II.

Coaching career
Following his playing career, Powers was an assistant coach under both Bob Devaney and Tom Osborne at the University of Nebraska from 1969 through 1976. 

After leaving Nebraska, Powers became the head coach at Washington State. One year after he left Nebraska, Powers took his unranked Washington State Cougars into Lincoln and knocked off the fifteenth-ranked Huskers in the season opener at Memorial Stadium. 

The following year in 1978, Powers became the head coach at Missouri. With the Missouri Tigers, Powers again went to Lincoln with another unranked team and pulled off a victory over the second-ranked Nebraska team. Following that game, it would be another 25 years until 2003 when the Missouri Tigers would again defeat the Nebraska Cornhuskers. During his tenure at Missouri, Powers compiled a  record, including four straight bowl appearances from 1978 to 1981. His best seasons came in 1980 and 1981, where he posted consecutive  records. In addition, his Tiger football teams went 3–2 in bowl games, defeating LSU in the 1978 Liberty Bowl, South Carolina in the 1979 Hall of Fame Classic, and Southern Miss in the 1981 Tangerine Bowl. During Powers' tensure, Missouri also played in the 1980 Liberty Bowl, losing to Purdue, and the 1983 Holiday Bowl, losing to a BYU Cougars team led by quarterback Steve Young.

On October 24, 1979, the NCAA's Committee on Infractions publicly reprimanded Missouri for a violation of NCAA Constitution related to a failure to exercise institutional control. The violation was in regard to the use of a fund established outside the university for the purpose of paying Powers for debt he assumed while negotiating to become Missouri's head coach. NCAA regulations require the university's involvement when its coach receives a cash supplement related to duties he is performing on the institution's behalf, and the NCAA found that Missouri had failed to do so.

After a disappointing 3–7–1 season in 1984 that concluded with another loss to rival Kansas, Powers was relieved of his duties.

Death
Powers died on November 2, 2021, in St. Louis, after suffering from Alzheimer's disease.

Head coaching record

See also
 List of American Football League players

References

External links
 

1941 births
2021 deaths
American football defensive backs
American football running backs
American Football League players
Missouri Tigers football coaches
Nebraska Cornhuskers football coaches
Nebraska Cornhuskers football players
Oakland Raiders players
Washington State Cougars football coaches
NCAA sanctions
Coaches of American football from Missouri
Players of American football from Kansas City, Missouri
Deaths from Alzheimer's disease